Enrico Insabato (born 1878 in Bologna and died in 1963) was an Italian orientalist and scholar of Islam. Some of his works are related with the history of research on Ibadism.

Works related to Ibadism 

 Insabato, E.: (1918) Gli Abaditi del Gebel Nefusa a la politica islamica in Tripolitania. Rome 1918. Istituto Coloniale Italiano. Sezione Studi e Propaganda. Memorie e Monografie Coloniali. Serie Islamica-1.
 Insabato, Enrico: (1920) L'Islam et la politique des alliés. L'Islam mystique et schismatique. Le problème du Khalifat. Adapté de l'Italien par Magali-Boisnard. Nancey/Paris/Strasbourg: Berger- Levrault, 1920.

References 

1878 births
1963 deaths
Date of birth missing
Date of death missing
Writers from Bologna
Place of death missing
Italian orientalists
Islamic studies scholars
Ibadi studies